Truth or Dare, also known as Blumhouse's Truth or Dare, is a 2018 American supernatural horror film directed and co-written (alongside Michael Reisz, Jillian Jacobs, and Chris Roach) by Jeff Wadlow. The film stars Lucy Hale, Tyler Posey, Violett Beane, Hayden Szeto, Sophia Taylor Ali, and Landon Liboiron as a group of college students who play a game of truth or dare while on vacation in Mexico, only to realize it has deadly consequences if they don't follow through on their obligations. Jason Blum produced through his Blumhouse Productions banner, and Universal Pictures distributed the film.

Released in theaters on Friday, April 13, 2018, the film received mostly negative reviews from critics, who said it was "neither inventive nor scary enough to set itself apart from the decades of dreary slashers that came before it." Regardless, the film was a box office success, grossing $95 million worldwide against its $3.5 million production budget.

Plot
Olivia Barron is a college senior who is seen by others as a good girl who always puts others' needs before her own. During her last spring break, although she initially plans to build houses with Habitat for Humanity, her best friend Markie Cameron convinces her to come to Mexico with their friends instead. At a bar, Olivia meets a man named Carter who invites them to go drinking at an abandoned church. There, Carter suggests they play truth or dare. During the game, their friend Tyson Curran reveals that Olivia has a secret crush on Lucas Moreno, Markie's boyfriend, which she denies. Carter admits that he tricked them into playing a supernatural version of the game and warns them to do whatever the game asks or they will be killed.

Back at school, Olivia sees hallucinations calling on her to pick truth or dare. She picks "truth" and blurts out that Markie has been serially unfaithful to Lucas. The friends learn that Ronnie, another friend, was forced to kill himself after failing to complete a dare. Lucas picks "truth" and admits that he has always had feelings for Olivia. Markie is forced to break Olivia's hand while their closeted friend Brad Chang is forced to admit to his father that he is gay.

Tyson remains in disbelief of the reality of the game’s consequences. He is then killed when he lies during his turn. The group discovers a story online about a woman named Giselle Hammond who lit a woman on fire in Mexico while playing truth or dare. They arrange a meeting with her through social media. Giselle reveals that her friends were playing the game in that same church. One friend, Sam Meehan, got drunk and began trashing the place. When they got home, the game somehow continued and only she and Carter survived. Carter was dared to involve more players in the game to give themselves more time before it became their turn again. Giselle reveals that she has been dared to kill Olivia and tries to shoot her, but her friend Penelope Amari dives in front and is killed instead. Having failed her dare, Giselle is forced to kill herself.

Olivia is dared to sleep with Lucas. While they have sex, Lucas is forced to admit that while he cares about her, he is still in love with Markie. Olivia and Lucas drive to Tijuana and meet Inez Reyes, a former nun at the church who cannot speak. By writing on paper, Inez tells them how she summoned an ancient demon named Calux who possessed the game of Truth or Dare to save herself from a sadistic priest. However, Calux kept the game going and killed all her friends. She trapped Calux with a ritual involving cutting off her tongue and sealing it in a pot. The group realize Sam must have broken the pot and released Calux, and to trap him, they need to find Sam.

Brad is dared to threaten his father with a gun. As he does so, he is shot and killed by an approaching officer. Olivia learns that Carter and Sam are the same person. She is dared to speak the truth and tells Markie that the night Markie's father killed himself, he had sexually assaulted Olivia and she had told him that Markie would be better off if he was dead. Though at first angry and hurt, Markie, after contemplating suicide with her father's handgun, forgives her friend, and tells her it is not her fault as her father had tried to kill himself before.

Olivia, Markie, and Lucas find Sam and force him back to the ruins of the church. As Sam goes through the ritual to trap Calux, Lucas is dared to kill either Olivia or Markie. When he refuses, Calux possesses him and forces him to kill himself after killing Sam so that the latter cannot complete the ritual. When Markie's turn comes, Olivia tells her to choose dare, then refuse to complete it. Calux possesses Markie, at which point Olivia forces Calux into the game by asking him to pick truth or dare. The demon is forced to tell the truth that there is no way they can make it out of the game alive because Sam is dead. They'll die unless they add more people to delay their next turn.

Olivia uploads a YouTube video, in which she briefly warns viewers about the game and its rules. She then asks "Truth or Dare," involving whoever hears the phrase into the game, delaying her and Markie's next turn for the time being.

Cast
 Lucy Hale as Olivia Barron
 Tyler Posey as Lucas Moreno
 Violett Beane as Markie Cameron
 Hayden Szeto as Brad Chang
 Landon Liboiron as Carter / Sam Meehan
 Nolan Gerard Funk as Tyson Curran
 Sophia Taylor Ali as Penelope Amari
 Sam Lerner as Ronnie
 Aurora Perrineau as Giselle Hammond
 Tom Choi as Officer Han Chang
 Joe Ochman as the voice of Callux
 Vera Taylor as Inez Reyes
 Ezmie Garcia as Young Inez Reyes
 Andrew Howard as Randall Himoff
 Gary Anthony Williams as the voice of the demon

Production

Development

Initially, director Jeff Wadlow explained that he was hired to direct the film after spitballing an opening scene based on the film's title in his initial meetings with Blumhouse. Subsequently, he joined with his friend Chris Roach, and his wife, Jill Jacobs, and started thinking of ideas to approach the final concept.

Filming
Principal photography on the film began on June 7, 2017, and wrapped on July 12, 2017, in Los Angeles.

Release
The film was initially set for release on April 27, 2018. But in January 2018, the date was moved up two weeks and premiered on April 13, 2018. The official trailer for the film was released on January 3, 2018.

Reception

Box office
Truth or Dare grossed $41.4 million in the United States and Canada, and $53.9 million in other territories, for a worldwide total of $95.3 million, against a production budget of $3.5 million.

In the United States and Canada, the film was released alongside Rampage and Sgt. Stubby: An American Hero, as well as the wide expansion of Isle of Dogs, and was projected to gross $12–15 million from 3,029 theaters in its opening weekend. The film made $8.3 million on its first day (including $750,000 from Thursday night previews), $6.8 million on Saturday and a total of $18.7 million over the weekend, finishing third behind Rampage ($35.7 million) and fellow horror film A Quiet Place ($32.6 million). It fell to 58% in its second weekend, grossing $7.8 million and finishing fifth. The film continued to hold well in its third weekend, dropping 58% again to $3.3 million, finishing in seventh place.

Critical response
The website's critical consensus reads, "Truth or Dare slick presentation isn't enough to make this mediocre horror outing much more frightening than an average round of the real-life game." On Metacritic, the film has a weighted average score of 35 out of 100, based on 33 critics, indicating "generally unfavorable reviews." Audiences polled by CinemaScore gave the film an average grade of "B−" on an A+ to F scale.

Simon Abrams of RogerEbert.com gave the film two stars out of four and wrote that "director Jeff Wadlow and his three credited co-writers don't go far enough towards either of their film's primary impulses—humanizing their immature subjects and/or making them die amusingly sadistic deaths." Varietys Owen Gleiberman called it a "scare-free horror film" and wrote, "The movie isn't scary, it isn't gripping, it isn't fun, and it isn't fueled by any sort of clever compulsion. It's just a strangely arduous exercise that feels increasingly frantic and arbitrary as it goes along." Edward Porter of The Times gave the film 1/5 stars, saying that it was "not so much a horror show as a soap opera with a high mortality rate."

Simran Hans of The Observer gave the film 2/5 stars, writing: "This tepid teen horror from Blumhouse Productions is a disappointing backwards stumble for the indie company, given its recent track record of cheap but effective genre thrills such as Split and Happy Death Day (as well as the considerably higher profile Get Out)." Robbie Collin of The Daily Telegraph also gave the film 2/5 stars, describing it as "the kind of film that must have seemed like a good idea at the time, but its initially appealing premise... quickly falls to pieces under its own self-generated confusions." Geoffrey Macnab of The Independent also gave the film 2/5 stars, writing: "A few moments of ingenuity aside, Truth or Dare is lacklustre filmmaking. Its premise is so contrived that any attempts at stirring up dread or suspense are stifled at the outset."

Bruce DeMara of the Toronto Star gave the film 2.5/4 stars, saying that it "isn't all that daring, although it is not without its twisted charm." Benjamin Lee of The Guardian gave the film 3/5 stars, writing: "Hackneyed horror tropes persist throughout and so does some crushingly exposition-heavy dialogue... but it rattles along at a fair lick, never resting for too long before another nasty surprise."

Accolades
The film was nominated at the 2018 Teen Choice Awards as Choice Drama Movie.
Lucy Hale was also nominated as Choice Drama Movie Actress for her performance in this film.

Sequel
In April 2018, Jeff Wadlow discussed ideas of a sequel, stating, "If the movie is a success and I'm asked to come up with other good ideas, there are other stories that could be told through the filter of a supernatural game of truth or dare."

References

External links
 
 

2018 films
2018 horror films
2010s teen horror films
2018 horror thriller films
American horror thriller films
American supernatural horror films
American supernatural thriller films
American teen horror films
Blumhouse Productions films
Demons in film
Films about death games
Films about spirit possession
Films directed by Jeff Wadlow
Films produced by Jason Blum
Films scored by Matthew Margeson
Films set in Mexico
Films set in London
Films set in Tokyo
Films shot in Los Angeles
Universal Pictures films
2010s English-language films
2010s American films